La série Montréal-Québec is a Québécois reality TV show broadcast by TVA since January 24, 2010. The show, promoted as a "rivalry TV show", pits two hockey teams, one representing Montreal and the other Quebec City.

Concept 
The concept was created by Stéphane Laporte, who also developed Star Académies adaptation in Quebec. The show recreates the rivalry that existed between the Montreal Canadiens and the Quebec Nordiques in the National Hockey League until 1995, when the Nordiques moved to Colorado.

The match commentator is Pierre Rinfret, assisted by the analyst Yvon Pedneault. The principal referee is Ron Fournier.

 Équipe de Montréal 
 Reporter : Laurence Bareil
 Head coach : Guy Carbonneau
 Assistant coaches : Patrice Brisebois and Serge Boisvert

 Eliminated player
 Player currently on waivers

 Équipe de Québec 
 Reporter : Pierre-Yves Lord
 Head coach : Michel Bergeron
 Assistant coaches : Jean-Louis Létourneau and Alain Côté

 Eliminated player
 Player currently on waivers

 Waivers 

 Match summaries 

 January 31, 2010 Players of the Game: Montreal – Sabrina Harbec
 Quebec – Julien Walsh

 February 7, 2010 Players of the Game: Montréal : Francis Leblanc
 Québec : Ken Arsenault

 February 14, 2010 Players of the Game:'
 Montréal : Vania Goeury
 Québec : Bruno Richard

February 20, 2010

February 28, 2010

March 7, 2010

March 14, 2010

March 21, 2010

References

External links 
 Official website of Équipe de Montréal 
 Official website of Équipe de Québec 
 Official online store

2010 Canadian television series debuts
2010 Canadian television series endings
Amateur ice hockey
Television shows filmed in Montreal
Television shows filmed in Quebec City
TVA (Canadian TV network) original programming
2010s Canadian reality television series